The 1983 Baylor Bears football team represented the Baylor University in the 1983 NCAA Division I-A football season. The Bears finished the season third in the Southwest Conference. They lost to Oklahoma State in the Astro-Bluebonnet Bowl, 14–24.

Schedule

After the season
The following players were drafted into professional football following the season.

References

Baylor
Baylor Bears football seasons
Baylor Bears football